Since acceding to the throne of Cambodia in 2004, King Norodom Sihamoni has made numerous state and official visits.

2004

2005

2006

2007

2008

2010

2012

2013

2014

2015

2016

2017

2018

2019

2020

2021

2022

2023

References

Cambodia diplomacy-related lists
Lists of diplomatic visits by heads of state